Albert "Pat" Beasley (16 July 1913 – 27 February 1986) was an England international footballer who made more than 400 appearances in the Football League. He also became a manager.

Football career
Born in Stourbridge, Worcestershire, Beasley began his career as a winger playing for local sides in Kidderminster, before joining Stourbridge. In 1931, while still only seventeen he was signed for £550 by Arsenal. Initially in the youth and reserve teams, he made his first-team debut away to Sunderland on 6 April 1932, but only played sporadically at first, with regulars Joe Hulme and Cliff Bastin keeping the young Beasley out of the side.

An injury to Hulme in 1933–34 opened the door for Beasley, who scored ten goals in 23 league games as Arsenal won the First Division title, and he remained in the side for the 1934–35 season. However Beasley faced competition from both Hulme and new signing Alf Kirchen, and he missed the Gunners' 1936 FA Cup Final win over Sheffield United. In October 1936 he was sold to Huddersfield Town for £750. In total he made 90 appearances for Arsenal, scoring 25 goals.

He spent three full seasons with Huddersfield Town, playing 108 league games, and reaching a second FA Cup Final in 1938, which they lost to Preston North End. In 1939 he won his one and only England cap in a match against Scotland; he scored, and England won 2–1. He also won two unofficial caps during the Second World War, in which he also occasionally guested for his old side Arsenal.

He continued to play after hostilities ended; after helping Fulham win the 1948–49 Second Division title, he became Bristol City's player-manager in 1950. He was manager until 1958. He became joint manager of Birmingham City in early 1958, alongside Arthur Turner, and took sole charge later that year. He led the team to the final of the 1958–60 Inter-Cities Fairs Cup, which Birmingham lost to Barcelona over two legs, and then resigned his post. He later scouted for Fulham and managed Dover. He retired to live in Chard, Somerset, and died in Taunton at the age of 72.

Honours

As player
Arsenal
 Football League First Division champions: 1933–34, 1934–35
Huddersfield Town
 FA Cup runner-up: 1937–38
Fulham
 Football League Second Division champions: 1948–49

As manager
Bristol City
 Football League Third Division South champions: 1954–55
Birmingham City
 Inter-Cities Fairs Cup runner-up: 1958–60

References

1913 births
1986 deaths
Sportspeople from Stourbridge
People from Chard, Somerset
English footballers
England international footballers
Association football forwards
Association football wing halves
Arsenal F.C. players
Huddersfield Town A.F.C. players
Fulham F.C. players
Bristol City F.C. players
Arsenal F.C. wartime guest players
Brentford F.C. wartime guest players
English football managers
Bristol City F.C. managers
Birmingham City F.C. managers
Dover F.C. managers
Fulham F.C. non-playing staff
FA Cup Final players